Man O Man was a British game show that aired on ITV from 4 May 1996 to 7 August 1999 and was hosted by Chris Tarrant.

Format
Each show had ten men compete in front of audience of 400 women, in a spoof of male beauty pageants.  They would compete in a series of challenges such as posing in swimming trunks, or trying to impress the women with the best pickup lines.  The audience then voted for which one they liked the best, with a number of eliminations in each round, and each man eliminated was pushed into a swimming pool by one of the show's models.

The last man left standing won a motorcycle.

Transmissions

References

External links

1996 British television series debuts
1999 British television series endings
1990s British game shows
ITV game shows
Man O Man
Television series by ITV Studios
Television series by Fremantle (company)
Television shows produced by Anglia Television
Television series by Reg Grundy Productions